Ballarat High School is a government secondary school located in Ballarat, Victoria, Australia.

Buildings and grounds 
The school was originally opened on 16 April 1907 as a Continuation School located at 208 Sturt Street (directly opposite the Ballarat Town Hall). This initial location was due to the need to make alterations to the Dana Street Primary school building. Initially, 37 students were enrolled. In September 1907, the school moved to a building attached to Dana Street Primary School which allowed for a larger enrollment and more staff.

In March 1909 it was announced that the foundation stone of the Agricultural College would be laid that month. In April 1910 the Ballarat Continuation School moved to its present site at the corner of Sturt and Gillies streets, Lake Gardens. The new building cost around 10,000 pounds to construct (approximately $1.3 million in 2018 terms) with a further 1000 pounds for fittings and fixtures. The school then became known as the Ballarat Agricultural High School. Many buildings were constructed around the grounds for the farm, including a concrete silo which still stands today and is listed on the Heritage Council of Victoria's register.

In July 1915 the new building was almost completely destroyed by a fire. The building was rebuilt over the next 18 months and classes resumed at the start of the 1917 school year. During the time between the fire and classes resuming, students were housed in various locations across Ballarat including the Lydiard Street Methodist Sunday School, St Pauls Hall in Ballarat East, the School of Mines, Humffray Street State School and the Ballarat East Town Hall.

During 1926 it was decided that the farm was no longer a viable option, and the decision was made to terminate the farming operations. Prior to this, in 1925 the school became known as a District High School, and it is believed that Ballarat High School may be the only school in Victoria to have been a Continuation School, an Agricultural High School, a District High School and finally a High School. The former farm area was converted into some of the best school sporting grounds in Ballarat.

Through the 1960s and 1970s the school's buildings expanded with the construction of the Junior Wing in 1962 (now reconstructed and known as the Transparent Learning Center), the Science Wing in 1965 (currently housing Technology Classes during the reconstruction of the Technology Wing) and the Sheehan Wing in 1976 (recently completely refurbished and redesigned in 2018–19).

In 1979 a single court gymnasium was constructed and opened in February 1980. During 1996 and 1997 this was extended to a total of 3 full-size basketball courts.

In 1991 a new amenities building was constructed and linked to the original 1910 canteen. This was further enhanced with the introduction of a self service system for students in 1996.

In 1993 the Art and Technology faculties moved into a new purpose-built building which also had the effect of creating the "quadrangle" which has become the center of the school.

During the 1980s and 1990s the North Wing's eclectic collection of portables came together with the addition of a gallery to make the area more waterproof.

In late 2004 the Robinson Center saw classes begin for Music, Drama and Food Technology courses, with the building replacing many classrooms across the school that had previously been used for these purposes. The former Drama Center behind the North Wing was demolished soon after the Robinson Center was completed.

In 2018 a new purpose-built Senior Learning Center was constructed on the Gillies street side of the school, housing Science Labs as well as being the new home for Year 12 students.

Also in 2018 a new ARCH Learning Center was constructed on the Western End of the School Grounds as a home for the school's Year 9 students who partake in the focused Year 9 program. This program was named the ARCH program, standing for Active, Resilient, Connected and Happy – but also referencing the school's location near the Arch of Victory.

In Term 4, 2019 Art and Technology classes where relocated from the Art/Technology building to allow it to undergo a major reconstruction. The building opened in late 2020, and was named the Sedgwick Centre after previous principal L.L Sedgwick.

Peacock Hall 

When the main building was rebuilt and extended after the 1915 fire, the Assembly Hall was relocated to the top floor. The hall was opened by then Premier Alexander Peacock and features large stained glass windows across both ends of the hall, as well as Honour boards listing students' war service in both World Wars. Boards along the side walls also list School Captains, Council Members, the Dux of the School as well as University graduates.

The stained glass windows were designed by local artist Amalia Field, while staff member Les Ottoway persuaded well known Melbourne artist George Dancey to design a memorial mural tablet for the hall. The tablet was unveiled by Major Baird on 9 April 1920 and features a finely executed mosaic mural symbolising the triumph of Good over Evil. The mosaic is seen as a fitting reminder of the school's contribution to the First World War.

In 2015 as part of the school's commemoration of the 100th anniversary of the ANZAC landings at Gallipoli, Ceramics teacher Paul Gerardi was the driving force behind the design and production of Ceramic Poppies with a display being placed on the school oval for the commemoration service. After the service, 100 of the poppies were formed into the shape of a wreath and mounted on the wall of Peacock Hall. The remainder of the Poppies were sold with funds raised being donated to the Ballarat branch of Legacy Australia.

Peacock Hall is listed on the Heritage Council of Victoria's register.

Sports 
The school's rowing tradition dates back to its Agricultural High School roots, but the school was not admitted to the BPSA until 1944. An early Head of the Lake win came in 1947, but rowing struggled until the construction of the school's Boat Shed on the shore of nearby Lake Wendouree in 1960. This facility has been upgraded several times over the years.

Since 1996, the school has been a specialist sport school and is a member of the Ballarat Associated Schools. Students represent the school in a range of sports across all year levels including: 
athletics
Australian rules football
rowing
tennis
basketball
netball
field hockey
badminton
soccer
cricket

BAS premierships 
Ballarat High has won the following BAS premierships.

Combined:

 Athletics (5) - 2002, 2003, 2009, 2010, 2011
 Badminton (8) - 1985, 1987, 1988, 1993, 1994, 1998, 2016, 2017
 Lap of the Lake - 2000
 Lawn Bowls (7) - 2000, 2003, 2013, 2014, 2015, 2019, 2020

Boys:

 Athletics (2) - 2009, 2011
 Badminton (2) - 2014, 2018
 Basketball (11) - 1989, 1997, 1998, 1999, 2000, 2001, 2003, 2004, 2005, 2006, 2007
 Cricket (13) - 1944, 1947, 1949, 1950, 1956, 1957, 1958, 1961, 1964, 1968, 1997, 2001, 2015
 Football (2) - 1958, 2001
 Hockey (6) - 1979, 1984, 1987, 2008, 2009, 2010
 Soccer (2) - 1984, 2004
 Tennis (9) - 1970, 1972, 1973, 1974, 1975, 1976, 1977, 1978, 2005
 Volleyball (4) - 1999, 2001, 2003, 2006

Girls:

 Badminton (8) - 2005, 2007, 2008, 2009, 2010, 2013, 2018, 2019
 Basketball (10) - 1981, 1998, 2002, 2003, 2004, 2005, 2009, 2010, 2012, 2014
 Cricket (2) - 1994, 1997
 Cross Country - 2009
 Hockey (8) - 1957, 1960, 1961, 1969, 2000, 2001, 2018, 2019
 Netball (10) - 1997, 1998, 1999, 2000, 2005, 2006, 2008, 2009, 2010, 2013
 Soccer (4) - 2010, 2011, 2013, 2014
 Softball (13) - 1959, 1960, 1961, 1968, 1975, 1979, 1992, 1994, 1995, 1996, 2007, 2009, 2010
 Volleyball (6) - 1981, 1995, 2006, 2007, 2008, 2012

Music 

Ballarat High School has a number of student bands, including the Concert Band and two senior stage bands; The Whizbang and BoB bands. Performances are frequently shown throughout the year to a range of audiences, with the BoB band performing at a Cabaret once every year and both stage bands performing at the quarterly whole school assemblies. The Whizbang band releases an annual CD made possible by Right Click Records, a local recording company. For junior students, there are a number of bands available such as Junior Stage Band and Year 8 Band.

Notable alumni

 Collis Birmingham, Australian representative to the 2012 Olympics in athletics
 Geoffrey Blainey, Professor of History at the University of Melbourne and Chair of Australian Studies, Harvard University
 Sir William Bridgeford, soldier, Royal Military College, Duntroon graduate and C.E.O. of the organising committee for the 1956 Melbourne Olympic Games
 Wilfred Burchett, journalist with the London Financial Times and the New York National Guardian and accused Soviet KGB spy 
 Roger Donaldson, movie director and producer
 The Hon. Tom Evans MLA, businessman and Member of Parliament
 William Charles Groves, anthropologist, educationist, Director of Education in Papua-New Guinea, and fellow of the Australian National Research Council
 Bridget Hustwaite (born 1991), Triple J radio presenter, television presenter, journalist and author
 Surgeon Rear Admiral Lionel Lockwood CBE MVO DSC FRACP FACMA RAN, Medical Director-General to the RAN, Honorary Surgeon to King George VI and Queen Elizabeth II and VFL footballer with the Melbourne University Football Club
 Sir Kenneth Luke, businessman and president of the Carlton Football Club and the Victorian Football League and inductee of the AFL Hall of Fame in 1996
 Kathryn Mitchell – Commonwealth Gold Medalist in the Javelin in 2018 and Dual Olympic representative
 Brad Sewell – 200 game player for Hawthorn FC in the AFL and 2013 premiership player
 Jared Tallent – Olympic Gold Medalist and Australian representative to the 2012 Olympics in athletics
 Wes Walters, artist and Archibald Prize winner
 Kyra Cooney-Cross, professional footballer for the national Matildas 
 Nick Hind

See also
List of schools in Ballarat
List of schools in Victoria, Australia
List of high schools in Victoria

References

External links
Ballarat High School website

Public high schools in Victoria (Australia)
Educational institutions established in 1907
1907 establishments in Australia
Ballarat Associated Schools
Schools in Ballarat